LaGrange is a town in Goshen County, Wyoming, United States. The population was 448 at the time of the 2010 census.

Geography
LaGrange is located at  (41.638359, -104.164330).

About LaGrange
LaGrange, Wyoming originated along the Texas cattle trail, offering settlers a place to gather. The town is named after Mr. Kale LaGrange, who settled in the area.

LaGrange serves as a meeting place for people living along both Horse Creek and Bear Creek. The annual LaGrange Mini-Fair, a big draw for the community, consists of family-oriented events such as a free will donation breakfast, parades, a rodeo for children, and an evening show with country & western entertainment.

The town has two churches, LaGrange Holiness Chapel and the non-denominational LaGrange Bible Church, and is home to the Frontier School of the Bible, a three-year college serving approximately 225 students annually.

LaGrange has a volunteer fire department and rescue unit. There are also American Legion and American Legion Auxiliary units active in civic duties, as well as a Home-makers Extension Club and 4H clubs.

Demographics

2010 census
As of the 2010 census, there were 448 people, 115 households, and 84 families residing in LaGrange. The racial makeup of LaGrange was 94.4% White, 0.9% African American, 0.9% Native American, 0.2% Asian, 2.9% from other races, and 0.7% from two or more races. Hispanics or Latinos of any race made up 7.1% of the population.

LaGrange had 115 households, of which 27.0% had children under the age of 18 living with them; 69.6% were married couples living together, 2.6% had a female householder with no husband present, 0.9% had a male householder with no wife present, and 27.0% were non-families. 26.1% of all households were made up of individuals, and 8.7% were someone living alone who was 65 years of age or older. The average household size was 2.55 and the average family size was 3.11.

The town's median age was 22.1 years. 17.2% of residents were under the age of 18; 41.5% were between the ages of 18 and 24; 13.6% were from 25 to 44; 17.1% were from 45 to 64; and 10.5% were 65 years of age or older. The gender makeup of the town was 52.5% male and 47.5% female.

2000 census
As of the 2000 census, there were 332 people, 86 households, and 57 families residing in LaGrange. The population density was 884.3 people per square mile (337.3/km2). There were 108 housing units with an average density of 287.7 per square mile (109.7/km2). The racial makeup of the town was 93.98% White, 0.30% African American, 1.81% Native American, 1.20% Asian, 0.30% Pacific Islander, 0.60% from other races, and 1.81% from two or more races. Hispanics or Latinos of any race made up 7.53% of the population.

There were 86 households, of which 31.4% had children under the age of 18 living with them; 58.1% were married couples living together, 9.3% had a female householder with no husband present, and 32.6% were non-families. 29.1% of all households were made up of individuals, and 10.5% were someone living alone who was 65 years of age or older. The average household size was 2.66 and the average family size was 3.40.

In the town, 21.7% of the population was under the age of 18, 39.8% from 18 to 24 years of age, 16.9% from 25 to 44, 10.5% from 45 to 64, and 11.1% 65 or older. The median age was 22 years. For every 100 females, there were 96.4 males. For every 100 females age 18 and over, there were 100.0 males.

The median income for a household in the town was $18,750, and the median family income was $27,917. Males had a median income of $16,875 and females $11,250. The town per capita income was $8,056. About 28.3% of families and 24.6% of the population were below the poverty line, including 21.3% of those under age 18 and 14.3% of those 65 or over.

History

An 1837 decree allowed the town of LaGrange to be platted, and land claimed all around it by the LaGrange brothers. Not much is known about the decree, but it allowed land to be claimed just by platting a town. Trail herds passing through LaGrange grazed on legally or illegally acquired land. While stories abound about early day residents, few can be documented. Most permanent residents had not arrived by then, but after about 1860, people came to Wyoming in greater numbers for various reasons. Quite a few took out homesteads at this time.

In the early spring of 1889, Wyoming cowboy S. J. Robb, and Nels Robertson, who owned a store in neighboring Banner County, Nebraska, formed a merchandising business. Kale LaGrange, for whom the town was named, was the owner and founder of the Miskimins' Ranch, and gave Robb and Robertson inducements to do so on the present site of LaGrange, which was part of the ranch. A store building was built, along with a home for Robb, who served as manager. Easterners began to move into the area, secured a mail route from Pine Bluffs and prepared to transform LaGrange into a so-called magic city of the plains.

In addition to a grocery store started by Robb, a large lumber yard and hardware store were established by Brown and Biggs, an ice house with a dance hall above it, a frontier saloon, a newspaper called The LaGrange Index (said to be founded by a man named John R. Smith), a cheese factory created by a Mr. Hendrickson (with milk supplied by Wyoming and Nebraska settlers), and a large gristmill on the banks of Horse Creek (which would later become Ed Johnson's place), where homesteaders brought wheat and corn to be made into flour and meal. The mill was steam-operated, fueled alternately by coal and pitch pine wood, and did substantial business for several years. A livery stable, where horses were fed and men drank and fought, was a part of the early business equipment.

Mr. Campbell was the first blacksmith to set up shop in LaGrange. Hendrickson's cheese factory was unprofitable and went out of business after two years. After the Biggs and Brown store burned to the ground under mysterious circumstances, the owners sold their interests to Robb, who became restless and sold it to Charles Badgett of Cheyenne. The store soon burned to the ground again, and a smaller one was built. The Yoder brothers then took over, followed by Rice, Tom Gartner, Beck, Tom McComsey and E. L. Chamberlain. Once again the store burned down.

The town was left without a store for several years. Then the LaGrange Mercantile Company was formed, bought a large hall and put in a large store that sold groceries, hardware, drugs, machinery. It too was eventually destroyed by fire. The company bought an old school and carried on there for a few months, then sold to the Mercer Mercantile Company, with Lester M. Mercer as its head.

In 1889, Robb had also established an official post office in LaGrange, then a part of Laramie County. It was supplied from a settlement called Salem,  to the south. The nearest post office, not on the same route, was called "Goshen" and located northwest on Bear Creek. According to the postal application, the town population at the time numbered between 250 and 300, although the post office served another 500 people. The post office application was signed by Gust F. Blixt, Post Master at Pine Bluffs, Laramie County, Wyo., July 24, 1889. National Archives records indicate that Robb was succeeded as postmaster by Dement Brown (1891), Martha A. LaGrange (1892), Benjamin F. Yoder (1893), Jerome S. Rice (1895), Wiliam H. Beck (1899), Oscar Yoder (1901), Martha A. LaGrange (1903), Martha A. Miskimins (1904), William R. Kirlin (1928), Verna Bess Coen (1954), Dale E. Howery (1956), and Theda Arnold (1972).

In the spring of 1890, a Union Sunday School was organized; it was the first in the area and drew people from miles around. Baptist and Presbyterian ministers came during the summer months. The first regular minister was Rev. Day, a Methodist. Services were held in the schoolhouse. Preachers were mainly homesteaders and included Rev. Puckett and Rev. Hughes. The town's first church, today the LaGrange Bible Church, was built in 1918 after Frank Jones, Otis Lovercheck, John Bunn, Harve Babbitt and Nels Sherard started a fundraising project. The church was located in the south part of the town and its basement was used as a school for a time. The church was under Presbyterian mission for some years and pastors were supplied that way. In 1947, it was organized as the LaGrange Community Church before becoming the LaGrange Bible Church; as of 2022, the resident pastor is Pastor Tom Harves. The Pilgrim Holiness Church was established in 1930, and its pastor is Rev. John Norwood.

The Stockgrowers Bank of Cheyenne had a bank in LaGrange from 1917 until 1923. Numerous other businesses flourished and waned in those years, including a flour mill run by water power, dance halls, and saloons. The first telephone line was extended into LaGrange in 1904. Later, and for several years, LaGrange had the only dial system central in Goshen County.

Mrs. Christine Roseberg, grandmother of Mrs. Bill Kirlin and Bert Cooper, was the first to be buried there. In April 1928, the site was moved to the hill east of town. Otis Lovercheck was responsible for planting numerous evergreen trees, visible for miles, and hauled water every day for long periods to get them established. Nels Sherard, E. L. Chamberlain, and Frank Wiand, all now deceased, followed in succession as caretakers. Clifford Gregory worked at the cemetery for several years, and Arthur McGill is currently in charge.

The Union Pacific Railroad brought about a new era to LaGrange when construction of a new railway began there in 1927. The line was completed by Labor Day, September 3, 1928, when five thousand people gathered in the town to celebrate the event. On Oct. 9, 1928, two hundred people were on hand to see a welcome train come through the town. During the railway construction, LaGrange experienced a boom and several grocery stores, hardware stores, a clothing store, bakery, drugstore, barbershops, and hotels sprung up. The town depot, stockyards, light plant, and schoolhouse were also built in 1928. The once-busy depot was closed and torn down in the 1970s, its lumber sorted and hauled to Torrington for construction of a building there. With the closure of the depot, railroad business was conducted by a mobile unit.

In 1934, an airport was built east of LaGrange, and was in use for several years.

On May 20, 1938, an election marked the culmination of LaGrange's incorporation. Cliff Noyes was elected mayor; the councilmen were Percy Fisher, Clyde Warner, Hugh Brady, and Oris Chamberlain. Subsequent mayors included Lester Mercer, W. E. Chamberlain, Jack Robertson, Arthur McGill, and Curtis Grandstaff.

The first school house built in LaGrange was a long building consisting of one room with four windows. Among the teachers were Martha Thomas, later known as Mrs. LaGrange and then as Mrs. Winnie Miskimins, Florence LaGrange, Miss Richards, Miss Gapes and Bessie Burke. The three R's were taught there; the average term was six months per year, and the teacher's salary $40 to $45 a month. LaGrange had the first consolidated school in the county, considered the best of its kind. A new gym was built and dedicated in 1951. Later, improvements included a new large room addition for kindergarten through sixth grade.

In 1967, the Frontier School of the Bible, a non-denominational bible college, was founded with twelve students enrolled. The student body grew substantially in subsequent years, and the former drugstore (the school's first building), old telephone office, barbershop, café building, Talbert's Garage and home, along with several other homes, were purchased by the school and remodeled or added to in order to provide classrooms, a dining hall, dormitories and homes for students and faculty, significantly changing the town's appearance. The school, with students from around the country, offers three-year courses in general preparations for the ministry, mission field, and Christian education. Classes are in session from mid-August to mid-May.

In 2022, YouTuber Crazed Fisherman made a parody music video of Taylor Swift's “Welcome to New York” single, bringing large amounts of tourists to LaGrange; the sightseers claimed to feel safe enough to sleep on the street.

Education
Public education in the town of LaGrange is provided by Goshen County School District Number 1.

Highways
 U.S. Highway 85

References

External links
 Town of LaGrange
 Frontier School of the Bible

Towns in Goshen County, Wyoming
Towns in Wyoming